Acanthotheelia is an extinct genus of sea cucumbers which existed in Poland during the Triassic period. It contains the species Acanthotheelia spinosa, Acanthotheelia spiniperjorata, and Acanthotheelia anisica.

References

Apodida
Prehistoric sea cucumber genera
Fossils of Poland
Triassic echinoderms